Sage-grouse are grouse belonging to the bird genus Centrocercus. The genus includes two species: the Gunnison grouse (Centrocercus minimus) and the greater sage-grouse (Centrocercus urophasianus). These birds are distributed throughout large portions of the north-central and Western United States, as well as the Canadian provinces of Alberta and Saskatchewan. The International Union for Conservation of Nature classified the
C. minimus species as endangered in 2020 and C. urophasianus as near threatened in 2016.

Names
The specific epithet is from another Greek word, "oura", plus "phasianos", pheasant. The noun "pheasant" was originally applied to a bird that was native to the valley of the Phasis River (now the Rioni River), which is located in Georgia. In the time of Lewis and Clark the word "pheasant" stood for "a genus of gallinaceous birds", according to lexicographer Noah Webster (1806), and the explorers often used it in that sense. "Gallinaceous" then referred to "domestic fowls, or the gallinae"; the family Galliformes (Latin "gallus", cock, and "forma", shape) now includes pheasants, grouse, turkeys, quail, and all domestic chickens.

Sage grouse are also collectively known as "sagehen," "sage grouse," "sage cock," "sage chicken," or "cock of the plains."

History
In their day, Lewis and Clark were credited with the 'discovery' of five gallinaceous birds in addition to the sage grouse — the Columbian sharp-tailed grouse, the dusky grouse, Franklin's grouse, the Oregon ruffed grouse, and the mountain quail — and what's certain is that they were the first to widely spread knowledge about these birds to the white man.

US military issues
In September 2016, the National Defense Authorization Act (NDAA) stalled in congress because Trump indicated he would not let the annual NDAA proceed to a vote in the House of Representatives unless it contained language to bar the sage grouse from the federal endangered species list until at least 2025. President Trump threatened a veto over the issue that Trump, Senate Armed Services Committee Chairman, believed would be sustained. Current US Air Force spending on sage grouse conservation is around US$200,000, with eight known military installations having confirmed grouse populations: Dugway Proving Ground and Tooele Army Depot in Utah; Sheridan Training Area and Camp Guernsey in Wyoming; Hawthorne Army Depot and Nellis Air Force Base in Nevada; Yakima Training Center in Washington, and Mountain Home Air Force Base in Idaho.

Species
There are two species:

The Mono Basin population may represent a third species.

Anatomical features
Adults have a long, pointed tail and legs with feathers to the toes. As in most Galliformes, there is pronounced sexual dimorphism.}

Courtship and mating
Centrocercus species are notable for their elaborate courtship rituals.  Each spring males congregate on leks and perform a "strutting display."  The male puffs up a large, whitish air sack on its chest, makes a soft drumming noise, and struts around with his tail feathers displayed and air sack puffed up. Groups of females observe these displays and select the most attractive males to mate with.  Only a few males do most of the breeding.  Males perform on leks for several hours in the early morning and evening during the spring months between February and April.  Leks are generally open areas adjacent to dense sagebrush stands, and the same lek may be used by grouse for decades.

Offspring
Hens build nests and lay and incubate their eggs under the cover of sagebrush. The hen uses grass and forbs between patches of sagebrush for additional cover. During incubation, female Sand Grouse undertake recesses, where they leave the nest to undertake self-maintenance activities, thought these recess activities are typically within 250 m of the nest.

Chicks can walk as soon as they are hatched and are able to fly short distances within two weeks. Within five weeks they are able to fly longer distances.

Conservation status
Populations of sage grouse are in decline due to environment loss and decline of the pristine plains environments it requires to mate. The sage grouse is found in significant numbers within only half of the states comprising its original territories. The Biodiversity Conservation Alliance and other organizations have petitioned to list the grouse under the Endangered Species Act.

In March 2010 the U.S. Fish and Wildlife Service (USFWS) concluded that greater sage-grouse are warranted for protection as "threatened" under the U.S. federal Endangered Species Act (ESA). However the USFWS also concluded that immediate listing was "precluded" by higher listing priorities for other jeopardized species. Thus they designated the species a "Level 8 Candidate" for addition to the list of threatened species at some future date. Their finding is being litigated by groups contending the species should immediately receive protections under the ESA.

The Agricultural Research Service (ARS) of the United States Department of Agriculture (USDA) investigated some of the reasons for the declining sage-grouse population. Researchers observed cattle who share grazing land with the sage-grouse. They found that cattle, after consuming about 40% of the tussocks in between sagebrush bushes, will continue to consume the tussocks growing underneath the sagebrush, thereby destroying the nesting habitat for the sage-grouse. In order to preserve the population of sage-grouse, ranchers can monitor the rate at which cattle consume the tussocks in between sagebrush bushes. Once cattle have consumed around 40% of the tussocks in between bushes, researchers ask that ranchers move their cattle to new grazing trail.

GPS trackers show that sage grouse congregate in small areas with certain resources, rather than being widely spread.

US federal conservation plans have been met with lawsuits from wildlife organizations.

On December 6, 2018, according to the New York Times:

As a mascot

The sagehen is the mascot of the Pomona-Pitzer Sagehens, the joint athletics program for Pomona College and Pitzer College, two of the Claremont Colleges.

References

External links
 Restoration Handbook for Sagebrush Steppe Ecosystems with Emphasis on Greater Sage-grouse Habitat. U.S. Geological Survey

 
Grouse
Bird genera
Taxa named by William John Swainson